Biosotis Lagnó (born 16 November 1969) is a Cuban former basketball player who competed in the 1992 Summer Olympics and in the 1996 Summer Olympics. She was born in Havana.

References

1969 births
Living people
Basketball players from Havana
Cuban women's basketball players
Olympic basketball players of Cuba
Basketball players at the 1992 Summer Olympics
Basketball players at the 1996 Summer Olympics